Boulogne–Jean Jaurès is a station on Line 10 of the Paris Métro in the 16th arrondissement. It lies under the Boulevard Jean Jaurès in the commune of Boulogne-Billancourt, which was named after Jean Jaurès (1859–1914), a French Socialist leader, who was assassinated at the beginning of World War I. He is also honoured at Jaurès, on lines 2, 5, and 7. East of this station, the line splits into separate eastbound and westbound sections until Javel–André Citroën.

History 
The station opened on 3 October 1980 as part of the extension of line 10 from Porte d'Auteuil, the first phase of an extension that aimed to serve the northern districts of Boulogne. It served as its western terminus until its subsequent extension to Boulogne–Pont de Saint-Cloud on 2 October 1981.

In 2019, the station was used by 3,785,458 passengers, making it the 129th busiest of the Métro network out of 302 stations.

In 2020, the station was used by 2,016,202 passengers amidst the COVID-19 pandemic, making it the 121st busiest of the Métro network out of 305 stations.

In 2021, the station was used by 2,700,354 passengers, making it the 128th busiest of the Métro network out of 305 stations.

Passenger services

Access 
The station has 3 accesses:
 Access 1: Boulevard Jean Jaurès, rue du Château côté numéros impairs
 Access 2: Boulevard Jean Jaurès, rue du Château côté numéros pairs
 Access 3: rue du Château

Station layout

Platforms 
The station has a single island platform flanked by two tracks due to the narrowness of the street it is built under.

Other connections 
The station is also served by lines 52 and 123 of the RATP bus network.

Gallery

Nearby
 Bois de Boulogne
 Église Notre-Dame de Boulogne

References

Paris Métro stations in Boulogne-Billancourt
Railway stations in France opened in 1980
Jean Jaurès